The 2018–19 Macedonian First League was the 27th season of the Macedonian First League, with 11 teams participating.

Rabotnički were the defending champions.

Competition format
The eleven teams that compose the league played a double-legged round robin tournament.

The two last qualified teams will join the relegation playoffs with the two best teams from the Second League.

Teams 

Eleven teams joined the league as Vodnjanska was not admitted in the league.

Vardar replaced Karpoš Sokoli and Strumica, relegated from the previous season.

Regular season

League table

Results

Super League

League table

Results

Relegation group

League table

Results

Playoffs
Playoffs will be played with a best-of-five games format, where the seeded team played games 1, 2 and 5 at home.

Relegation playoffs

|}

References

External links
 Macedonian First League website
 Macedonian First League at Eurobasket.com

Macedonian First League (basketball) seasons
Macedonian
Basketball